The Vyborg Side is a 1939 Soviet drama film directed by Grigori Kozintsev and Leonid Trauberg, the final part of trilogy about the life of a young factory worker, Maxim. The film was also released in the United States under the title New Horizons.

Background
The Vyborg Side is a traditional industrial area in Saint Petersburg, Russia, on the right bank of the River Neva delta. It is named because of its situation at the start of the road to Vyborg, a formerly important city taken from Swedish empire by Russian army under Peter I in early 18 century during the Great Northern War and securing the existence of Russia's new capital Saint Petersburg.
The Vyborg Side was filled with industrial enterprises of different complexity, producing sugar, textiles, timber and later, since the 19th century, many kinds of heavy industry products. There were factories e.g. by Ericsson and the Nobel family. Working and living conditions for workmen were varied, but generally considered harsh, and illegal Socialist propaganda of various political factions successfully spread among workers in the last decades of 19th century and early decades of the 20th century. There were strikes, and World War I caused both battle losses and famine in the city. Not surprisingly factory workers supported in 1917 the February revolution that overthrew monarchy and the October Revolution that promised to end private ownership of factories and actually of workers' lives. People's militia was formed on the Vyborg Side to counteract any attempts of counter revolution and maintain public order. These detachments were called Red Guards. Vladimir Lenin before the October Revolution returned from hiding in semi-autonomous Finland to a safe house on the Vyborg Side, from whence on the eve of the revolution he was conducted to the revolutionary headquarters in Smolny by a Finnish bodyguard of his to head the developments.

Plot
Following the Russian Revolution, Maksim is appointed state commissar in charge of the national bank. With great efforts, he learns the complexies of the banking trade and begins to fight off sabotaging underlings. Dymba, now a violent enemy of the Republic, tries to rob a wine store but is arrested with Maksim's help. Maksim also exposes a conspiracy of a group of tsarist officers who prepare an assassination attempt against Lenin. He then joins the Red Army in its fight against the German occupation.

Cast
 Boris Chirkov - Maksim
 Valentina Kibardina - Natasha
 Mikhail Zharov - Platon Vassilievich Dymba
 Natalya Uzhviy - Yevdokia Ivanovna Kozlova
 Yuri Tolubeyev - Yegor Bugai
 Anatoli Kuznetsov - Worker's Deputy Turayev
 Boris Zhukovsky - Defense Attorney
 Aleksandr Chistyakov - Mishchenko
 Nikolai Kryuchkov - soldier
 Vasili Merkuryev - student
 Mikheil Gelovani - Stalin
 Leonid Lyubashevsky - Sverdlov
 Maksim Shtraukh - Lenin
 Ivan Nazarov - Lapshin
 Dmitri Dudnikov - Ropshin

References

External links
 
 Historical Dictionary of Russian and Soviet Cinema By Peter Rollberg

1939 films
Lenfilm films
Films set in Russia
Soviet black-and-white films
Films directed by Grigori Kozintsev
Films directed by Leonid Trauberg
Films scored by Dmitri Shostakovich
Articles containing video clips
Soviet drama films
1939 drama films
Vyborgskiy District of Saint Petersburg
World War I films set on the Eastern Front
Russian Revolution films
1930s Russian-language films